Cóbano is a district of the Puntarenas canton, in the Puntarenas province of Costa Rica.

History 
During the colonial period the entire Nicoya peninsula was administratively part of the Partido de Nicoya (nowadays Guanacaste), it was at the beginning of the 20th century that President Alfredo González Flores signed a decree that transferred the administration of Lepanto along with Paquera and Cóbano (towns in the extreme south of the Nicoya peninsula) to the province of Puntarenas. This was due to the fact that at that time it was faster to reach Paquera by sea by boat from Puntarenas, than by the existing land routes to Nicoya. At present there is a certain political impulse in Guanacaste to administratively reincorporate the entire Nicoya peninsula into the province of Guanacaste, arguing that the Inter-American Highway allows rapid land communication with Guanacaste, in addition they argue that the word Guanacaste is internationally associated with tourism and that therefore probably the beaches of the south of the peninsula are more visited by foreign tourists.

Cóbano was created a separate district on 4 August 1971 by Decreto Ejecutivo 1897-G, segregating from the Paquera district.

Geography 
Cóbano has an area of  km² and an elevation of  metres.

Demographics 

For the 2011 census, Cóbano had a population of  inhabitants.

Transportation

Road transportation 
The district is covered by the following road routes:
 National Route 160
 National Route 624

References 

Districts of Puntarenas Province
Populated places in Puntarenas Province